Oberland am Rennsteig is a former municipality in the Sonneberg district of Thuringia, Germany. Since 31 December 2013, it is part of the town Sonneberg.

References

Former municipalities in Thuringia